Ubaranai Dam  is a rockfill dam located in Hokkaido Prefecture in Japan. The dam is used for irrigation. The catchment area of the dam is 14 km2. The dam impounds about 34  ha of land when full and can store 4300 thousand cubic meters of water. The construction of the dam was started on 1978 and completed in 2000.

References

Dams in Hokkaido